The Berkeley Rose Garden is a city-owned park in the North Berkeley area of Berkeley, California. The rose garden is situated in a residential area of the Berkeley Hills between the Cragmont and the La Loma Park neighborhoods, occupying most of the block between Eunice Street and Bayview Place along the west side of Euclid Avenue, and west of Codornices Park.

Rose Garden 
The Berkeley Rose Garden is in the form of a terraced amphitheater located in a small canyon and has views of the city and bay of San Francisco and the Golden Gate. More than 100 rose varieties grow along the terraces, with maximum blooming occurring in mid-May. The park is bisected by Codornices Creek. The north side of the Rose Garden includes a set of tennis courts.  The south side is a grove of coast redwoods, bay laurel and coastal live oak trees.

Construction of the rose garden began in 1933 with funds provided by the federal Civil Works Administration.  Construction continued in subsequent years with funding from the California State Relief Administration and the federal Works Progress Administration.  It opened on September 26, 1937. Since its inception, the Rose Garden has been the site of a number of rose shows.

Codornices Park 
Across Euclid Avenue is Codornices Park, an older city park (established 1915) of which the Rose Garden was initially considered an extension.  Codornices includes a large lawn, picnic area, children's play equipment and a long concrete slide.  Here, two forks of Codornices Creek have their confluence, right along the line of the Hayward Fault.  The clubhouse of the Codornices Club, a neighborhood improvement and social club, once stood on a lot adjacent to the top of the concrete slide.

A pedestrian tunnel runs under Euclid, connecting the Rose Garden with Codornices Park.  In this section, from 1912 to 1928, before the Rose Garden was established, a  wooden streetcar and road trestle spanned Codornices Creek along Euclid.  In late 1928 through early 1929, the trestle was filled in,  a culvert laid through it for the creek, and the pedestrian tunnel constructed.  Much of the fill originated from the excavation of a small hill on the UC Berkeley campus as part of the construction of Giannini Hall.

Using the concrete slide

To use the slide it is recommended to sit on top of a piece of cardboard the size of a normal doormat. There is usually a small quantity of cardboard available to the public at the top or bottom of the slide for this purpose. Bringing your own cardboard is a good idea if it has recently rained. Intermediate and expert slide users  sprinkle a couple handfuls of sand at the top of the slide before embarking for a more thrilling experience.

References

Footnotes

Sources
Annual Reports of the City of Berkeley Recreation Department, 1933-1940
Berkeley Gazette, September 27, 1933

External links
City of Berkeley's web page about the garden.
Article by Gray Brechin that includes a description of the Rose Garden.
Friends of the Rose Garden, a volunteer group that helps take care of the garden.

Gardens in California
Berkeley Hills
Parks in Berkeley, California
Rose gardens in the United States
Berkeley Rose Garden
Tourist attractions in Berkeley, California
Culture of Berkeley, California
Landmarks in the San Francisco Bay Area